The following describes the qualification process for boxing at the 2015 Pan American Games.

Qualification system
A total of 120 boxers (96 male and 24 women) will qualify to compete at the games. The top three boxers in each men's category at the 2015 World Series of Boxing will qualify. The rest of the quotas (including all the women's quotas) will be awarded at a qualification tournament in June 2015. Canada as host nation has an automatic berth in one women's and five men's categories, and will need to qualify in all other categories.

Qualification timeline

Qualification summary

Men

Light flyweight

Flyweight

Bantamweight

Lightweight

Light welterweight

Welterweight

Middleweight

Light heavyweight

Heavyweight

Super heavyweight

Women

Flyweight

Lightweight

Middleweight

References

External links
World Series of Boxing rankings

Qualification for the 2015 Pan American Games
Qualification